Serra da Saudade is a Brazilian municipality located in the center of the state of Minas Gerais. The population density is 2.3/km2. The village belongs to the meso-region of Central Mineira and to the micro-region of Bom Despacho. It became a municipality in 1962.

Location
The village center of Serra da Saudade is located at an elevation of 738 meters in a mountainous area of the Serra da Saudade. Neighboring  municipalities are:  Quartel Geral (N),  Dores do Indaiá (E), Estrela do Indaiá (S), and São Gotardo (W).

Distances
Belo Horizonte: 273 km
Luz: 54 km south on MG-235, then MG-176
Dores do Indaiá: 19 km southeast on dirt road (2002)
Estrela do Indaiá: 17 km south on MG-235

Economic Activities
Services and agriculture are the most important economic activities.  The GDP in 2005 was approximately R$7 million, with 4 million coming from services.  There were 113 rural producers on 19,000 hectares of land.  25 farms had tractors (2006).  Approximately 250 persons were employed in agriculture.  The main crops are coffee, beans and corn.  There were 15,000 head of cattle (2006) of which 1,000 were dairy cattle. 

There were no banks (2007).  In the vehicle fleet there were 124 automobiles, 4 trucks, 21 pickup trucks, 4 micro-buses, and 11 motorcycles.  (2007).

Health and Education
In the health sector there was 1 public health clinic. (2005).  Patients with more serious health conditions are transported to Divinópolis or Belo Horizonte.  Educational needs of 170 students were met by 1 primary school and 1 pre-primary school.  There was no middle school.  

Municipal Human Development Index: 0.742 (2000)
State ranking: 348 out of 853 municipalities as of 2000
National ranking: 2114 out of 5,138 municipalities as of 2000 
Literacy rate: 81%
Life expectancy: 71 (average of males and females)

In 2000 the per capita monthly income of R$217.00 was below the state average of R$276.00 and below the national average of R$297.00.  Poços de Caldas had the highest per capita monthly income in 2000 with R$435.00.  The lowest was Setubinha with R$73.00.

The highest ranking municipality in Minas Gerais in 2000 was Poços de Caldas with 0.841, while the lowest was Setubinha with 0.568.  Nationally the highest was São Caetano do Sul in São Paulo with 0.919, while the lowest was Setubinha.  In more recent statistics (considering 5,507 municipalities) Manari in the state of Pernambuco has the lowest rating in the country—0,467—putting it in last place.

References

See also
 List of municipalities in Minas Gerais

Municipalities in Minas Gerais